Bani Suheila is a Palestinian town in the southern Gaza Strip part of the Khan Yunis Governorate.

History
The history of these towns goes back to Canaanite, Philistine, and Roman times. Before 1948, these towns boasted numerous khans (inns) for travelers.   Khan Yunis owes its name to a Mamluk official who built its large khan in the 14th century.

For centuries, the coastal area was a main thoroughfare between Egypt and the Mediterranean coast, used by traders and conquering armies alike. The trade route through Gaza to Egypt brought great economic advantage to the area. In previous centuries, the lack of restricting borders enabled unobstructed communication and travel and the intermixing of influences and styles, especially among the Bedouin tribes. This rich agricultural area prospered by settled Bedouin tribes that became active in regional trade on routes connecting Egypt, the Levant, and Arabia. Many families benefited from the increase in regional trade and became large land owners during this time. During Ottoman rule, the Al Qarra clan became the largest landowning family in southern Gaza due to their vast trade networks.

Bani Suheila was marked Maatadieh Village on Jacotin’s map surveyed during Napoleon's 1799 invasion.

In 1838, Edward Robinson  called it  Beni Sehileh, located in Gaza.
In 1863, the French explorer Victor Guérin found Bani Suheila to have about 1,300 inhabitants, while an official Ottoman village list of about 1870 showed  209 houses and a population of 440, though the population count included men, only.

As recorded in 1886, Bani Suheila was a large village containing 120 huts, partly built of stone, partly of adobe, and surrounded by gardens of watermelons, figs, palms, jummez, apricots and legumes. In the north a good but deep well, worked by a camel, supplied drinking water. Near the town, in Sheikh Yusuf several ancient remains, including small twisted marble columns and building stones were found.

British era
In the 1922 census of Palestine conducted by the British Mandate authorities, Bani Suheila   had a population of 1,043 inhabitants, all Muslim, increasing in the 1931 census to 2,063,  still all Muslims, in 406 houses.

At the end of the  Mandate  period, in  the 1945 statistics, Bani Suheila had   a population of 3,220, all Muslims,  with 11,128  dunams of land, according to an official land and population survey. Of this, 54 dunams were for plantations and irrigable land, 10,639 used for cereals, while 97  dunams were built-up land.

Post 1948
During the night of August 31, 1955, Israeli armed forces attacked Bani Suheila. On April 5, 1956, Israeli artillery shelled the town.

According to the Palestinian Central Bureau of Statistics the population of Bani Suheila had grown to 32,800 people in mid-year 2006. The city is currently under Hamas administration.

References

Bibliography

External links
Welcome To The City of Bani Suheila

Khan Yunis Governorate
Cities in the Gaza Strip
Municipalities of the State of Palestine